ATCA or Atca may refer to:

 Advanced Telecommunications Computing Architecture, a series of specifications by the PCI Industrial Computer Manufacturers Group
 The Turkish town of Atça
 The  Alien Tort Claims Act, a United States law which provides redress for violations of customary international law.  Also known as the Alien Tort Statute.
 The Australia Telescope Compact Array, a radio telescope at the Paul Wild Observatory, twenty five kilometres (16 mi) west of the town of Narrabri in Australia.